This is a list of colonial governors of Seychelles, an archipelagic island country in the Indian Ocean. Seychelles was first colonized by the French in 1770, and captured by the British in 1810, who governed it under the subordination to Mauritius until 1903, when it became a separate crown colony. Seychelles achieved independence from the United Kingdom on 29 June 1976.

List of governors
Italics indicate de facto continuation of office

For continuation after independence, see: List of presidents of Seychelles

See also
Seychelles
Politics of Seychelles
List of presidents of Seychelles
Vice-President of Seychelles
Prime Minister of Seychelles
Lists of office-holders

References

External links
World Statesmen – Seychelles

Governor
Governors
 
Seychelles
Seychelles
European colonisation in Africa